Diego Osvaldo Bielkiewicz (Korean: 비엘키에비치; born 4 January 1991) is an Argentine professional footballer who plays as a forward for Chilean side Provincial Osorno.

Career
Bielkiewicz started his senior career with Lanús. In 2010, he signed for Club Atlético Atlanta in the Primera B Metropolitana, where he made forty-two appearances and scored five goals. After that, he played for San Telmo, Flandria, Gimnasia y Tiro, Estudiantes de Buenos Aires, Defensores de Belgrano, Deportes Iquique, Seoul E-Land, Rangers de Talca, and CD Magallanes, where he now plays.

In November 2021, Bielkiewicz moved to India and signed with newly promoted I-League club Rajasthan United FC on a season-long deal.

In January 2023, he joined Provincial Osorno in the Segunda División Profesional de Chile.

References

External links 
 Seoul E Biel Kevich, “The K-League is running a lot and being rough” 
 Interview Seoul E-land FC Biel Kevich, "I will prove my value with a goal!" 
 The hard road of the Polish hero 
 Bielkiewicz: "I did not imagine being playing the Libertadores" 
 Bielkiewicz: The team matters more than the scorer

1991 births
Living people
Argentine people of Polish descent
Footballers from Buenos Aires
Argentine footballers
Club Atlético Lanús footballers
Club Atlético Atlanta footballers
San Telmo footballers
Flandria footballers
Gimnasia y Tiro footballers
Estudiantes de Buenos Aires footballers
Defensores de Belgrano footballers
Deportes Iquique footballers
Seoul E-Land FC players
Rangers de Talca footballers
Deportes Magallanes footballers
Magallanes footballers
Rajasthan United FC players
Club Cipolletti footballers
Provincial Osorno footballers
Argentine Primera División players
Primera B Metropolitana players
Primera Nacional players
Torneo Federal A players
Chilean Primera División players
K League 2 players
Primera B de Chile players
I-League players
Segunda División Profesional de Chile players
Argentine expatriate footballers
Argentine expatriate sportspeople in Chile
Expatriate footballers in Chile
Argentine expatriate sportspeople in South Korea
Expatriate footballers in South Korea
Argentine expatriate sportspeople in India
Expatriate footballers in India
Association football forwards